Crematogaster chiarinii is a species of ant in tribe Crematogastrini. It was described by Emery in 1881.

References

chiarinii
Insects described in 1881